KOEZ (104.1 FM) is a commercial radio station broadcasting a soft adult contemporary music radio format, switching to Christmas music for part of November and December. Licensed to Ames, Iowa, the station serves the Des Moines metropolitan area. The station is owned by the Des Moines Radio Group subsidiary of Saga Communications. The station's studios are located on Locust Street in Des Moines, while its transmitter is located near Woodward.

History
The original call sign was KLFM. It was owned by Paul D. Lunde and was branded as "KLFM Stereo - Ames; Central Iowa's first 24-hour FM station." It aired a beautiful music format with ABC FM Radio Network news at 15 minutes after the hour.

Robert and Norma Bunce were the owners of Bunce Broadcasting Corporation. Bob started his broadcasting career as a disc jockey with KCBC and later bought the station in 1968. Robert sold KCBC in 1975 and purchased KLFM in Ames. The station call letters were changed to KEZT, known as Lite 104. He sold KEZT in 1997.

In 1981, it became KEZT with a contemporary EZ format programmed by KalaMusic. A new 1,000 foot tall tower was constructed and KEZT-FM became one of the top rated Arbitron stations in Des Moines.

In 1997, the station was purchased by Saga Communications, was rebranded as "Lite 104.1 KLTI," and the studios were moved to their current location at 1416 Locust Street in Des Moines.

On March 3, 2014, the station rebranded as "More 104", and moved away from Soft AC to a more upbeat adult contemporary format. The call sign was changed to KMYR. After the Christmas season in 2017, KMYR adjusted back to soft AC and rebranded slightly to "More 104.1."

On September 30, 2019, KMYR changed call letters to KOEZ. On October 18, after stunting through the 17th with all-Elton John music (as an eventually-postponed June 2020 concert during his Farewell Yellow Brick Road Tour, to be held at Wells Fargo Arena, had been announced that day), the station rebranded as “104.1 EZ FM”.

Christmas music
Each holiday season since 1998, KOEZ drops its regular music format and plays Christmas music for several weeks leading up to Christmas Day. The station traditionally flips to Christmas music prior to Thanksgiving. Currently, KOEZ is the only commercially-licensed non-religious station in the Des Moines market to devote its entire playlist to the holiday format.

Other stations in the Des Moines market attempted to compete with KOEZ in playing the Christmas format. KPTL (now KXNO-FM) in 2013 and KMXD (now KDRB) in 2004, both owned by Clear Channel Communications (now iHeartMedia) flipped to all-Christmas music for a single year but did not continue in subsequent years.

Logos

References

External links

OEZ (FM)
Radio stations established in 1964
Soft adult contemporary radio stations in the United States